Nycteola indicatana is a moth of the family Nolidae first described by Francis Walker in 1863. It is found in the Indian subregion, Sri Lanka, Singapore, Borneo, Java and the Solomon Islands.

Description
Forewings pale gray with irregular transverse dark gray fasciation. A central triangle and a dark sub-basal bar found in the costa. A submarginal row of darker dots present. Posterior dots are large. The caterpillar has a pale green and yellowish-green body. Whitish primary setae arise from white dots. A pale spiracular line and faint dark dorsal line visible. Pupation occurs in a canoe-shaped pure white silken cocoon.

Larval host plants are Eugenia, Lagerstroemia and Syzygium.

Subspecies
Four subspecies are recognized.
N. i. indicatana - Indian subregion, Sri Lanka
N. i. microdonta - Singapore, Borneo
N. i. parvella - Java
N. i. ferrugana - Solomon Islands

References

Moths of Asia
Moths described in 1863
Nolidae